Al-Hemyari is a surname. Notable people with the surname include:

 Abu Karib Al-Hemyari (390–420 CE), king
 Hassan Al-Hemyari (date of birth 400), king
 Harbi Al-Hemyari (died c. 806−816), alchemist
 Nashwan Al-Hemyari (Died 1178), historian, poet, writer, judge

Surnames
Arabic-language surnames
Himyarites